Les Afriques dans le monde (LAM) is a French academic research institute in Pessac, France focusing on Africa and its diaspora. 

It is a collaboration of the national reseach organisation CNRS (Centre national de la recherche scientifique) and three local universities: the Political science institute of the University of Bordeaux, the Bordeaux Montaigne University) and the University of Pau and the Adour Region. LAM was founded in 2011 by merging the Centre d’étude d’Afrique noire (CEAN, University of Bordeaux) and the Centre d’étude et de recherche sur les pays de l’Afrique orientale (CREPAO, University of Pau and the Adour Region) with other researchers joining.

The research field of LAM is the "Africas": Sub-Saharan Africa, North Africa and by extension the African diaspora in the Middle East and transatlantic regions, mainly the Caribbean. In 2022 LAM had 26 researchers, fifty-odd PhD students and some 100 associated researchers. Since 2021 it is headed by David Ambrosetti.

Research
Five research themes are addressed by LAM :
 State, regulations and contestations in the Africas
 Spaces, (im)mobilities, diasporas
 Imagination, arts, subjectivities
 Markets and entrepreneurship in Africa
 Health risks, agrarian crises and environmental challenges

Collaborations 
LAM is a member of the Africa-Europe Group for Interdisciplinary Studies (AEGIS), a European academic research network for African studies, of which LAM's precursor institute the Centre d’étude d’Afrique noire (CEAN, Bordeaux) was among the founders.

Within France LAM participates in the multidisciplinary research group Études africaines en France (African studies in France) of the Centre national de la recherche scientifique (CNRS).

LAM organised annual meetings of Africanists in France, such the 3e Journées du Réseau des études africaines (REAf) at Bordeaux in 2014, the 6th European Conferences on African Studies (ECAS 2015) in Paris and the 7e Rencontres des Études Africaines en France (7e REAf and 6e JCEA) at Toulouse in 2022 (JCEA : Rencontres des Jeunes Chercheur·e·s en Études Africaines).

Journals of LAM
LAM supports the academic journals Afrilex, Cahiers d’Outre-Mer, Études littéraires africaines, Politique africaine in collaboration with the Paris Institut des mondes africains (IMAF) and Revue Sources.

References

External links 
 
 

2011 establishments in France
Africa-Europe Group for Interdisciplinary Studies
African studies
French National Centre for Scientific Research
Institut d'études politiques de Bordeaux
University of Pau and the Adour Region